Metzneria staehelinella is a moth of the family Gelechiidae. It was described by Englert in 1974. It is found in Portugal, Spain and France.

References

Moths described in 1974
Metzneria